Suicide in Mozambique is a significant national social issue. It has one of the highest suicide rates in the world, and Mozambique is Africa's most suicide-prone area. However, suicide only accounts for a fraction of the deaths in the country. Mozambique's mental health infrastructure is considerably understaffed, with only thirteen psychiatrists.

Incidence
Data regarding suicide in Mozambique, like that of the rest of Africa, is limited. In 2011, there were 2,667 recorded suicides in Mozambique, accounting for approximately 0.9% of all deaths in the country for that year. Nonetheless, the country's suicide rate of 18 per 100,000 was the 19th-highest in 2011; it increased to sixth-highest in 2015. According to a 2014 report, Mozambique had the most suicides in the entire African continent.

Methodology and prevention
According to a 2014 study, the most common suicide methods for males and females were hanging and ingesting toxic substances respectively. With only thirteen psychiatrists in the entire country with a population of some 28 million people, Mozambique is poorly equipped to tackle its suicide rate.

References

Mozambique
Death in Mozambique